Ismo Uskali Mäki (born 8 February 1951 Helsinki) is a Finnish professor in the Department of Political and Economic Studies (Philosophy) at the University of Helsinki. He is also director of the Trends and tensions in Intellectual Integration centre, which was recently nominated "Finnish Centre of Excellence" in the Philosophy of the Social Sciences. Previous posts and roles have included his being a professor of philosophy at the Erasmus University of Rotterdam where he directed the Erasmus Institute for Philosophy and Economics and his being the editor of the Journal of Economic Methodology. His main research interests lie in the methodology of economics and the philosophy of the sciences including social sciences with his approach typically being described as a realist philosophy of economics. Mäki is currently serving as an Academy Professor for the Academy of Finland.

Selected publications 
Mäki, U., Gustafsson, B., & Knudsen, C. (1993). Rationality, institutions, and economic methodology. London: Routledge.

References

1951 births
Living people
20th-century Finnish economists
Finnish philosophers
Philosophers of science
Political philosophers
Academic staff of Erasmus University Rotterdam
Academic staff of the University of Helsinki
21st-century Finnish economists